The Canadian Collegiate Athletic Association Soccer National Championships is the playoff tournament to determine the Canadian Collegiate Athletic Association (CCAA) National champions in women's and men's soccer.

2013 Nationals
The 2013 CCAA Men's Soccer National Championship will be hosted by the University of New Brunswick -Saint John. 
The 2013 CCAA Women's Soccer National Championship will be hosted by Kwantlen Polytechnic University.

2013 CCAA Men's Soccer National Championships
 Humber College
 Thompson Rivers University
 Douglas College
 Northern Alberta Institute of Technology
 Grant MacEwan University
 Dawson College
 University of New Brunswick -Saint John
 Mount Saint Vincent University

2013 CCAA Women's Soccer National Championships
 Grant MacEwan University
 Collège François-Xavier-Garneau
 Thompson Rivers University
 Algonquin College
 Collège Ahuntsic
 Northern Alberta Institute of Technology
 Kwantlen Polytechnic University
 Holland College

2012 Nationals
2012 was the first time the tournament expanded from six to eight teams, and the first time since 1994 men and women were hosted by separate institutions. Douglas College hosted the 2012 CCAA Men's Soccer National Championships and Holland College hosted the 2012 CCAA Women's Soccer National Championships. 

2012 CCAA Men's Soccer National Championships
 Humber College
 Vancouver Island University
 Collège François-Xavier-Garneau
 Seneca College
 Douglas College
 Northern Alberta Institute of Technology
 Southern Alberta Institute of Technology
 Holland College

2012 CCAA Women's Soccer National Championships
 Collège Ahuntsic
 Concordia University College of Alberta
 Northern Alberta Institute of Technology
 Thompson Rivers University
 Collège François-Xavier-Garneau
 Humber College
 Holland College
 Mount Saint Vincent University

2011 Nationals
In 2011, the event was hosted by Collège François-Xavier-Garneau and was sponsored by Big Kahuna and adidas. The women's title was won by Collège François-Xavier-Garneau. The men's event was won by Northern Alberta Institute of Technology.

2011 CCAA Men's Soccer National Championships
 Northern Alberta Institute of Technology
 Holland College
 Vancouver Island University
 Collège François-Xavier-Garneau
 Humber College
 Champlain College Saint-Lambert

2011 CCAA Women's Soccer National Championships
 Collège François-Xavier-Garneau
 Northern Alberta Institute of Technology
 Collège Ahuntsic
 Thompson Rivers University
 University of King's College
 Humber College

2010 Nationals
In 2010, the event was hosted by Northern Alberta Institute of Technology and was sponsored by Big Kahuna and adidas. The women's title was won by Collège François-Xavier-Garneau. The men's event was won by Vancouver Island University. The host institution's men and women's NAIT Ooks both earned a spot in the gold-medal games and finished with silver.

2010 CCAA Men's Soccer National Championships
 Vancouver Island University
 Northern Alberta Institute of Technology
 Humber College
 Concordia University College of Alberta
 Dawson College
 UNB Saint John

2010 CCAA Women's Soccer National Championships

 Collège François-Xavier-Garneau
 Northern Alberta Institute of Technology
 Humber College
 Concordia University College of Alberta
 Kwantlen Polytechnic University
 Holland College

2009 Nationals
In 2009, the event was co-hosted by Seneca College and Humber College and was sponsored by Big Kahuna and adidas. The Seneca College Sting won the women's title. The men's event was won by the Concordia University College of Alberta. 

2009 CCAA Men's Soccer National Championships

 Seneca College
 Collège François-Xavier-Garneau
 Douglas College
 Mount Royal University
 Algonquin College
 Holland College

2009 CCAA Women's Soccer National Championships

 Concordia University College
 Fanshawe College
 Kwantlen Polytechnic University
 Collège François-Xavier-Garneau
 Humber College
 Mount Saint Vincent University

2008 Nationals
Thompson Rivers University was the host of the 2008 CCAA National Soccer Championships in Kamloops, BC.

2008 CCAA Men's Soccer National Championships
 Capilano University
 Algonquin College
 Concordia University College
 University of King's College
 Thompson Rivers University
 Collège François-Xavier-Garneau

2008 CCAA Women's Soccer National Championships
 Langara College
 Thompson Rivers University
 Humber College
 Collège François-Xavier-Garneau
 MacEwan University
 Holland College

Capilano University Roster

Head Coach : Paul Dailly
Assistant Coaches: Darren Rath, Leo Nash

Official Site

2007 Nationals
In 2007, the event was hosted by Mount Saint Vincent University and was sponsored by Big Kahuna and adidas. The women's title was won by Collège François-Xavier-Garneau. The men's event was won by Champlain College Saint-Lambert.

2007 CCAA Men's Soccer National Championships

 Champlain College Saint-Lambert
 Algonquin College
 Mount Royal University
 Thompson Rivers University
 University of King's College
 UNB Saint John

2007 CCAA Women's Soccer National Championships

 Collège François-Xavier-Garneau
 Mount Royal University
 Durham College
 Capilano University
 University of King's College
 Mount Saint Vincent University

Past winners

Source:

See also
 2009 CCAA Soccer Championship

References

External links
 Official website
University and college soccer in Canada competitions